Nikola Marković (born 7 July 1989) is a Serbian professional basketball player for CSM Oradea of the Romanian Basketball League. He is a 2.08 m (6 ft 10 in) tall power forward-center. He won one Championship with Oradea, and one SuperCup - both in 2020.

Professional career
Markovic started his professional career at KK Mega Basket, where he had 6 successful seasons before moving to Radnički Belgrade.

He moved back to FMP Železnik for the 2010–11 season and went to Crvena zvezda for the 2011–12 season. He joined Radnički Belgrade again for the 2012–13 season, but in March 2013, he moved to Vojvodina Srbijagas. He then moved to KAOD for the 2013–14 season.

He joined Panelefsiniakos for the 2014–15 season, and for the next season he moved to PAOK.

In July 2016, he signed with Polish club Trefl Sopot. On 5 January 2018 he left Trefl Sopot and signed with Stelmet Zielona Góra for the rest of the season.

Serbian national team
Marković was a member of the junior national teams of Serbia. He played at the 2007 FIBA Europe Under-18 Championship in Spain, where he won the gold medal. He also played at the 2009 FIBA Europe Under-20 Championship.

He also played with Serbia at the 2013 Mediterranean Games, where he won a silver medal, and at the 2013 Summer Universiade, where he won a bronze medal.

References

External links
 Nikola Marković at fiba.com
 Nikola Marković at realgm.com
 Nikola Marković at eurocupbasketball.com
 Nikola Marković at esake.gr 

1989 births
Living people
ABA League players
Basketball players from Belgrade
Basket Zielona Góra players
Centers (basketball)
Competitors at the 2013 Mediterranean Games
CSM Oradea (basketball) players
K.A.O.D. B.C. players
KK Crvena zvezda players
KK FMP (1991–2011) players
KK Radnički FMP players
KK Vojvodina Srbijagas players
Medalists at the 2013 Summer Universiade
Mediterranean Games medalists in basketball
Mediterranean Games silver medalists for Serbia
Panelefsiniakos B.C. players
P.A.O.K. BC players
Power forwards (basketball)
Serbian expatriate basketball people in Greece
Serbian expatriate basketball people in Poland
Serbian expatriate basketball people in Romania
Serbian men's basketball players
Stal Ostrów Wielkopolski players
Trefl Sopot players
Universiade bronze medalists for Serbia
Universiade medalists in basketball